Anna Guzowska (née Pacholak; born 15 January 1980) is a Polish sprinter who specialized in the 200 metres.

Achievements

Personal bests
100 metres - 11.71 s (2004)
200 metres - 22.87 s (2003)
400 metres - 51.29 s (2005)

See also
Polish records in athletics

External links

1980 births
Living people
Polish female sprinters
Athletes (track and field) at the 2004 Summer Olympics
Olympic athletes of Poland
People from Sieradz
Sportspeople from Łódź Voivodeship